Mazhavaraayas or Mazhavars were the Polygars of Ariyalur. They were different from the Mazhavaraya clan who were kins of Chozhas. Their original title being Nayanar, their leader was awarded with  Ranavijaya Oppilla Mazhavaraya title by a ruler of Vijayanagara Kingdom, under whom they served, for defeating certain Prathaparudran and they adopted the title since. Ramanayanar is recorded to be the first of these polygars. The original title of these polygars is Nayanar.

In 1735, Rangappa Mazhavaraaya of Ariyalur donated  of land to a church.

See also
Palaiyakkarar

References

Social groups of Tamil Nadu